Mommenheim may refer to:

 Mommenheim, Bas-Rhin, France
 Mommenheim, Germany